The Peugeot 607 is an executive car produced by the French manufacturer Peugeot from September 1999 to June 2010.

The 607, along with the smaller 407, were superseded by the 508 in March 2011.

History
The 607 was launched in October 1999, to replace the discontinued 605. It used its predecessor's chassis but had an all-new, more modern exterior design. The engine range (2.2 and 3.0 petrol, and 2.2 diesel) was completely new. Built in Sochaux until March 2009, manufacture was transferred to PSA's Rennes plant in July the same year as production was being wound down.

Equipment levels were high, with all models getting air conditioning, CD player, electric windows, 8 airbags, anti-lock braking system, tyre-pressure monitor, and central locking as standard. Available was AMVAR nine-stage electronic damping control.

In France, its home market, the 607 was often chosen for official government use.

Safety

Facelift
The 2.0 and 2.2 diesel engines increased in output and included a 6-speed transmission, like the newly introduced Peugeot 407.

During 2008, the 607 was withdrawn from the United Kingdom, marking the end of right-hand drive 607s.

Peugeot 607 Paladine

The Peugeot 607 Paladine is a special Landaulet version of the 607 which was developed and built in 2000 in cooperation with Heuliez, as a concept car. The engine is the 3.0 V6. It is a one off design.

The special leather interior was developed in cooperation with Hermès.

The car was first presented at the Geneva Motor Show in March 2000. It was used seven years later by then French President Nicolas Sarkozy for his inauguration on May 16, 2007. Meanwhile, the car had been retrofitted with the 2004 restyling of the 607 (updated front end).

Successor
In November 2009, Philippe Varin from PSA announced that the successor of the Peugeot 607 would not be called the Peugeot 608, but instead the Peugeot 508. The 508 also replaced the smaller Peugeot 407.

Engines
Gasoline
 2.2 16v 
 3.0 V6 24v  (only pre-facelift)
 3.0 V6 24v  (only facelift)

Diesel
 2.0 HDi  (only in pre-facelift)
 2.2 HDi  (only in pre-facelift)
 2.0 HDi  (only in facelift)
 2.2 HDi  (only in facelift)
 2.7 HDi  (only in facelift)

Sales

References

External links

607
Euro NCAP executive cars
Front-wheel-drive vehicles
Sedans
Executive cars
2000s cars
2010s cars
Cars introduced in 1999